Krushna Arjun Ghoda (1953 or 1954 – 24 May 2015) was an Indian politician and member of the 13th Maharashtra Legislative Assembly. He represented the Palghar Assembly Constituency as member of Shiv Sena. He was a Shiv Sena politician from Palghar district, Maharashtra. He had also represented Dahanu Vidhan Sabha constituency in 1999 and 2004.

Positions held
 1999: Elected to Maharashtra Legislative Assembly (1st term) 
 2004: Re-Elected to Maharashtra Legislative Assembly (2nd term) 
 2014: Re-Elected to Maharashtra Legislative Assembly (3rd term)
 2015: Elected as vice chairman of Thane District Central Co-operative Bank

See also
 Palghar Lok Sabha constituency

References

External links
 Shiv Sena Official website

1950s births
2015 deaths
Maharashtra MLAs 2014–2019
Maharashtra MLAs 2004–2009
Maharashtra MLAs 1999–2004
Shiv Sena politicians
Marathi politicians
People from Palghar